Kathryn Wylde is an American executive working in the non-profit industry. Since 2011, she has been the President and CEO of the Partnership for New York City, a non-profit that advocates with the city and state government on behalf of large businesses and their ultimate bottom line. The Partnership is funded almost exclusively through membership donations from over two hundred and fifty corporations in the city. Her work at the behest of these entities has been noteworthy throughout the last decade. In a late 2020 interview, she billed herself "the lone defender of the billionaires at this point". Indeed, the group's latest available IRS filings in Pro Publica show Wylde is a highly remunerated executive in the city and took in over $1.1 million as recently in 2018. This would make her one of the highest paid non-profit executives in the State of New York and is at least five times more than the compensation received by the Mayor of New York City or the Governor of New York State.

Biography 
Prior to becoming the leader of the Partnership, Wylde was the founding CEO of both the Partnership's housing and investment fund affiliates. She serves on a number of boards and advisory groups, such as the New York City Economic Development Corporation, the Fund for Public Schools, the conservative Manhattan Institute, Sponsors for Educational Opportunity, and the Governor's NYC Regional Economic Development Council. Wylde has also served as director of the Federal Reserve Bank of New York. In 2018, City and State magazine considered her to be the third most important person in New York City and State, after Michael Bloomberg and Stephen M. Ross. Crains New York Business listed her among the 50 most powerful women in New York City in 2017. Her Sunday routine was profiled in 2011 by The New York Times.

Views 
According to The New York Times Wylde was among a number of prominent New Yorkers (and one of the primary movers) authoring a follow-up letter to Amazon, asking it to reconsider its decision to not build Amazon HQ2 in New York City. Her group also paid for a follow-up ad in the Times. She felt that the handling of the Amazon HQ2 situation had tarnished NYC's reputation as a place to do business.

In reference to New York City's proposed ‘Pied-à-Terre’ Tax on Multimillion-Dollar Second Homes, Wylde has indicated that she does not think the proposed tax will be well received by the business community, suggesting that such a tax — combined with the recent tax code change that capped the amount of local income taxes that can be deducted on federal income taxes — might push the wealthy to reconsider living in NYC.  In response to Mayor Bill de Blasio announcement of a new paid vacation day requirement, Wylde commented: “The New York business community got no heads-up on this ‘national first’ announcement, so apparently we are not the audience being addressed, although local entrepreneurs will certainly be the victims”

More recently in March 2021, the Partnership wrote to currently embattled Governor Cuomo against taxing the wealthy. They wrote, "ultimately, these new taxes may trigger a major loss of economic activity and revenues as companies are pressured to relocate operations", repeating unverifiable theme as the public and legislature has increased pressure to raise taxes on the wealthy. Recent Quinnipiac poll finds that three out of five New Yorkers supporting taxing the wealthy, especially as the wealthy have enhanced their balance sheets during COVID-19

References

Living people
Year of birth missing (living people)
21st-century American businesswomen
21st-century American businesspeople
Businesspeople from New York City
Women nonprofit executives
American nonprofit chief executives